The Blood Hole massacre occurred in what is now the Australian state of Victoria at Middle Creek,  from Glengower Station between Clunes and Newstead at the end of 1839 or early 1840, killing an unknown number of Aboriginals from the Grampians district who were on their way home after trading goods for green stone axe blanks that they obtained near what is now Lancefield.

Captain Dugald McLachlan established Glengower station, sometimes employing local Aboriginal people from the Dja Dja Wurrung (Jaara people). His employees also gave out flour and sugar rations to Aboriginals on occasion.

The massacre happened after the station hands found the cook hanging from a meat hook near the kitchen at the end of the day. Later the Aboriginals who had passed through on their way home were found at Middle Creek, a camping place on the Aboriginal trading route from the Grampians to the Greenstone quarry at Mount William near Lancefield.

The Aboriginal people were found at the waterhole on Middle Creek west of Glengower Station. The Aboriginals sought to hide by diving into the waterhole, where they were shot one at a time as they came up for air.

References

Further reading
 
 

History of Victoria (Australia)
Dja Dja Wurrung
Massacres of Indigenous Australians